M/V Grand Luxe is a  motor yacht launched in 2007 and operated by Seafair.

Overview 
It was designed by naval architects Dejong & Lebet and Luiz De Basto Designs, Dejong & Lebet. The ship was launched in 2007 in Freeland, Washington. The ship began service as an art museum, touring port cities along the US east coast.

In 2016 M/V Grand Luxe underwent a multi-million dollar renovation to become solely a venue for private events.

References

2007 ships
Yachts
Passenger ships of the United States